Nelaug is a village in the southern part of the municipality of Åmli in Agder county, Norway. The population (2001) was 161.  The village lies at east of the Nelaug lake, which is regulated by a hydroelectric power plant. The most notable feature in the village is the train station, Nelaug Station, which is the junction between the main Sørland Line and the branch Arendal Line. Nelaug school is a 1st through 6th grade elementary school. It is one of the three schools in Åmli municipality. Nelaug sits at the end of Norwegian County Road 412 which connects Nelaug to the Norwegian County Road 415 and the rest of Norway.

Name
The Old Norse form of the name must have been Niðlaug. The first element Nið is the old name of the river Nidelva and the last element is laug which means "lake".

References

External links
 Nelaug website
 Jernbaneverket's entry on Nelaug station

Villages in Agder
Åmli